Optomerus roppai is a species of beetle in the family Cerambycidae. It was described by Magno in 1995.

References

Rhinotragini
Beetles described in 1995